A by-election for the seat of Dale in the Legislative Assembly of Western Australia was held on 7 May 1988. It was triggered by the resignation of Cyril Rushton (the sitting Liberal member and a former deputy premier) on 25 February 1988. The seat was retained by the Liberal Party, with their candidate, Fred Tubby, winning 59.1 percent of the two-candidate-preferred (2CP) vote. The Labor Party did not stand at the election, despite having lost the seat by less than 400 votes at the 1986 state election. A former Labor candidate, Michael Marsh, won 40.9 percent of the 2CP vote standing as an independent.

Background

Cyril Rushton had held Dale for the Liberal Party since a 1965 by-election, and served as a minister in the governments of Sir Charles Court and Ray O'Connor (including as deputy premier under the latter). Rushton underwent open-heart surgery in August 1987, and missed much of the following parliamentary session. He resigned from parliament on 25 February 1988, and the writ for the by-election was issued on 30 March, with the close of nominations on 14 April. Polling day was on 7 May, with the writ returned on 12 May.

Results

Aftermath
Tubby joined his father, Reg Tubby, in parliament, and the pair served together until Reg's retirement at the 1989 state election (a period of less than a year). The seat of Dale was abolished in a redistribution prior to that same election, and Fred Tubby switched to the new seat of Roleystone, which he held until his defeat at the 2001 state election.

See also
 List of Western Australian state by-elections

References

Western Australian state by-elections
1988 elections in Australia
May 1988 events in Australia
1980s in Western Australia